Sarah Brown may refer to:
 Sarah Brown (athlete) (born 1986), American middle-distance runner
 Sarah Brown (cook), British pioneer vegetarian TV cook
 Sarah Brown (model) (1869–?), pseudonym of Marie Roger, French artists' model in 1890s Paris
 Sarah Brown (politician), British Liberal Democrat politician and transgender activist
 Sarah Jane Brown (born 1963), charity director, wife of former British prime minister Gordon Brown
 Sarah Joy Brown (born 1975), American actress

See also
 "The Idyll of Miss Sarah Brown", a 1933 short story by Damon Runyon
 Sarah Brown Ingersoll Cooper (1835–1896), American philanthropist and educator
 Sarah Elizabeth Utterson née Brown (1781–1851), English translator and author
 Sarah Lee Brown Fleming (1875–1963), African-American educator, writer, and activist